Poledo was a Canadian alternative rock band based in Thornhill, Ontario, consisting of vocalist and bassist Joshua Malinsky, vocalist and guitarist Mitch Roth and drummer Dave Capogna, Their music is characterized by loud, heavily distorted guitar riffs and screamed lyrics.

History
Poledo was formed in 1994 in Thornhill.  the band released two independent cassettes, Buzz Muffin and Let Up, before signing to Sonic Unyon.

They released the full-length album There, You on Sonic Unyon in 1995, and shared a split 7-inch single, Lunar Landing Confirmed, with Hayden on Toronto's Squirtgun Records in 1996. Both releases charted on Canada's campus radio charts in 1996.  The band performed as far west as Vancouver that year.

The band broke up in December 1997; after performing one final show in early 1998, Malinsky and Roth both joined Hayden's touring band. Rare unreleased tracks later appeared on two compilation albums, Sonic Unyon's Now We Are 5 and Squirtgun Records' More of Our Stupid Noise, and a cassette of recordings from their never-completed second album was released at their final show under the title The Poledo Demos.

Malinsky subsequently went solo under the name Kid Lunch, releasing an eponymous CD on Teenage USA in 1999.

References

Musical groups established in 1994
Musical groups disestablished in 1998
Musical groups from Toronto
Canadian alternative rock groups
1994 establishments in Ontario
1998 disestablishments in Ontario
Canadian noise rock groups
Sonic Unyon artists